Kabyai Creek massacre or Kaibai Creek massacre (August 17, 1854) was a massacre against Winnemem Wintu people. A party of white settlers attacked a Winnemem Wintu village at Kabyai Creek, on the McCloud River.  42 Winnemem Wintu men, women and children were killed.

The site of the village is on the McCloud River at the mouth of Kabyai Creek across the river from the McCloud Bridge Campground in the Shasta–Trinity National Forest, in Shasta County, California. The village site is among those of the Winnemem Wintu being threatened with being submerged by Shasta Lake if the proposed raising of Shasta Dam occurs.

References 

Conflicts in 1854
Native American history of California
Winnemem Wintu
Massacres of Native Americans
Wars between the United States and Native Americans
1854 in California
History of Shasta County, California
History of racism in California
August 1854 events
California genocide